The siege of Thionville may refer to one of four sieges of the French town of Thionville:
Siege of Thionville (1558)
Siege of Thionville (1639)
Siege of Thionville (1792)
Siege of Thionville (1870)